322d may refer to:

322d Air Expeditionary Group, a provisional United States Air Force unit assigned to the United States Air Forces in Europe
322d Airlift Division, an inactive United States Air Force organization
322d Bombardment Squadron, an inactive United States Air Force unit
322d Fighter-Interceptor Squadron, an inactive United States Air Force unit
322d Strategic Reconnaissance Squadron, an inactive United States Air Force unit
322d Troop Carrier Squadron, an inactive United States Air Force unit

See also
322 (number)
322, the year 322 (CCCXXII) of the Julian calendar